Star Venture is a play-by-mail game begun by Schubel & Son in 1982. The game was open-ended and computer moderated.

Gameplay

Star Venture was a play-by-mail computer-moderated game set in a 125-star galaxy, in which each player is the captain of one or more starships which players may utilize to achieve whatever goals they desire. The game is open-ended and players have no victory conditions to achieve to win the game.

Within certain limits, players begin at their starport (called Imperia) by purchasing from a menu of available starships. Ships are differentiated by space available to carry items (cargo, weapons, personnel, etc.), and their damage rating. Players use ground parties and colonies to explore worlds in the game; according to reviewer W.G> Armintrout, "Colonies are what people fight over", for economic reasons. Combat is part of the game to include combat between ships and between ships and colonies. According to Armintrout, competition in the game was fierce because many players came from Schubel & Son's game The Tribes of Crane. He also noted the importance of alliances in the game.

Reception
In the April 1983 edition of Dragon (Issue 72), Michael Gray stated "This game is thematically quite like Star Master, though it seems to be more closely structured."

W.G. Armintrout reviewed Star Venture in The Space Gamer No. 63. Armintrout commented that "Star Venture is a fascinating game.  I recommend it, with a few warnings: (1) This is not a game for novices, and (2) it requires some mathematical ability and a blazing competitive will.  I also commend Schubel & Son for their lightning speed in publishing errata and in implementing player suggestions (already adding convoy and special message rules)."

See also
 List of play-by-mail games

References

Bibliography

Further reading
 

Play-by-mail games